UltraBay is originally IBM's name for the swappable drive bay in the ThinkPad range of laptop computers. When the ThinkPad product line was sold to Lenovo, the concept and the name stayed. Furthermore, it is used in some of Lenovo's own IdeaPad Y Series laptops.

Introduced with the ThinkPad 750 series in 1995, this technology has gone through redesigns with almost every new generation of ThinkPad, which may lead to confusion. The following table gives an overview of the different UltraBay types, in which models they occurred and which drives are available for them. Note that the optical drive bay in G series and R40e series ThinkPads is not an UltraBay in that the drives are fixed and not removable. It is however, mechanically, an UltraBay 2000-device without the surrounding "caddy".

On the media side different UltraBays relate to the form factor of the drives they accept; Some machines can accept UltraBay devices up to 12.5 mm thick, whereas others are limited to devices no more than 9.5 mm thick.

The IdeaPad Y400 and Y500 laptops have an UltraBay slot which can be swapped for another hard drive, another fan or another Nvidia GT650M (or GT750M) GPU which will work in SLI with the system's primary video card for increased graphics performance.  Existing orders for the UltraBay Y500 DVD Burner (no built in optical drive) were cancelled in early June, 2013.

Starting in 2014, Lenovo changed the design of the ThinkPad bay adapter and dropped the "UltraBay" terminology from use.  What remained (in the ThinkPad W540 product) was an option for a removable Serial ATA (SATA) "Caddy" accessory which, with a screw driver, allowed the optical drive to be replaced with a second 2.5 inch SATA storage device.  Battery expansion in the Caddy Bay was no longer offered, and earlier hot-swap functionality was essentially rendered difficult if not impossible.

Nomenclature

See also
Disk enclosure
Caddy (hardware)

References 

Computer peripherals
UltraBay
IBM laptops
ThinkPad